The 1993 Skoda Czech Open was a men's tennis tournament played on Clay in Prague, Czech Republic as part of the International Series of the 1993 ATP Tour.
Karel Nováček was the defending champion, but he did not compete.

Sergi Bruguera won the title by defeating Andrei Chesnokov 7–5, 6–4 in the final.

Seeds

Draw

Finals

Top half

Bottom half

References

External links
 Official results archive (ATP)
 Official results archive (ITF)

Prague Open (1987–1999)
1993 ATP Tour